The 1898 College Football All-America team is composed of American football players who were selected as the best players at their positions by various organizations that chose College Football All-America Teams that season. The organizations that chose the teams included Collier's Weekly selected by Walter Camp and the Syracuse Herald. 

The 1898 season marked the first time players from the west were named to the All-American teams. Michigan center William Cunningham and Chicago fullback Clarence Herschberger were the first two western players to receive the recognition.  Prior to 1898, all of the prior All-America football teams had been selected from among five Ivy League teams – Harvard, Princeton, Yale, Penn, and Cornell.

Key

 
 WC = Walter Camp for Collier's Weekly 
 CW = Casper Whitney for Harper's Weekly
 H = Syracuse Herald, Syracuse, NY
 NYS = New York Sun, selected by Hugh H. Janeway, ex-Princeton player
 NYET = New York Evening Telegram
 OUT = Outing Magazine
 LES = Leslie's Weekly by Charles E. Patterson
Bold = Consensus All-American

All-Americans of 1898

Ends
Lew Palmer, Princeton (WC-1; CW-1; NYS-1; NYET-1; OUT-2; LES-1)
John Hallowell, Harvard (WC-1; CW-1; NYS-1; NYET-1; OUT-2; LES-2)
N. T. Folwell, Penn (WC-3; H)
Art Poe, Princeton (College Football Hall of Fame) (WC-2; H; OUT-1; LES-1)
Francis Douglas Cochrane, Harvard (WC-2; OUT-1)
Walter Smith, Army (WC-3)
Chadwell, Williams (LES-2)

Tackles
Art Hillebrand, Princeton (College Football Hall of Fame) (WC-1; CW-1; H; NYS-1; NYET-1; OUT-1; LES-1)
Burr Chamberlain, Yale (OUT-1; LES-1; WC-1 [g]; CW-1 [g]; H [g]; NYS-1 [g])
Percy Haughton, Harvard (College Football Hall of Fame) (WC-2; NYET-1; OUT-2; LES-2)
Allen Steckle, Michigan (WC-2)
Malcolm Donald, Harvard (OUT-2)
Edwin Sweetland, Cornell (WC-3)
Robert C. Foy, Army (WC-3)
S. M. Goodman, Penn (LES-2)

Guards
Truxtun Hare, Penn (WC-1 [t]; H [t]; NYS-1 [t]; NYET-1 [t]; OUT-1 [g]; LES-1 [g])
Gordon Brown, Yale (College Football Hall of Fame) (WC-1; CW-1; NYS-1; NYET-1; LES-1)
Walter Boal, Harvard (WC-2; CW-1; OUT-1)
Josiah McCracken, Penn (WC-2; H; OUT-2; LES-2)
Big Bill Edwards, Princeton (OUT-2)
C. A. "Brute" Randolph, Penn State (WC-3)
Daniel A. Reed, Cornell (WC-3; LES-2)

Centers
Pete Overfield, Penn (WC-1; H; NYS-1; NYET-1; OUT-1; LES-1)
William Cunningham, Michigan (WC-2; CW-1)
Percy Malcolm Jaffrey, Harvard (WC-3; OUT-2)
Booth, Princeton (LES-2)

Quarterbacks

Charles Dudley Daly, Harvard (College Football Hall of Fame) (WC-1; CW-1; H; NYS-1; NYET-1; OUT-2; LES-1)
Frank Hudson, Carlisle Indians (OUT-1)
Walter S. Kennedy, Chicago (WC-2)
Leon Kromer, Army (WC-3)
Charles Street, Michigan (LES-2)

Halfbacks
Benjamin Dibblee, Harvard (WC-1; CW-1; H; NYS-1; NYET-1; OUT-1; LES-1)
John H. Outland, Penn (namesake of the Outland Trophy) (WC-1; NYET-1; OUT-1)
Malcolm McBride, Yale (CW-1)
Leicester Warren, Harvard (WC-2; NYS-1)
Richardson, Brown (WC-2; LES-2)
Allen E. Whiting, Cornell (OUT-2; LES-2)
Alfred H. Durston, Yale (OUT-2)
Raymond Benedict, Nebraska (WC-3)
Raymond, Wesleyan (WC-3)

Fullbacks
Clarence Herschberger, Chicago (College Football Hall of Fame) (WC-1; H; OUT-1; LES-1)
Charles Romeyn, Army (WC-3; CW-1; NYS-1)
Bill Reid, Harvard (H; NYET-1; OUT-2; LES-1)
Pat O'Dea, Wisconsin (College Football Hall of Fame) (WC-2)
Wheeler, Princeton (LES-2)

See also
 1898 All-Southern college football team
 1898 All-Western college football team

References

All-America Team
College Football All-America Teams